Gümüş (Turkish for "silver") is a Turkish melodrama originally broadcast in Turkey by Kanal D from 2005 to 2007 and very popular in Arab world with a name of Noor which has 85 million viewership on its last episode.

Plot
After the death of his girlfriend in a car accident, Mehmet's grandfather suggests that he marry Gümüş, who has loved Mehmet since childhood. Initially happy about the marriage, Gümüş despairs when she realizes that his heart is not in it. Eventually, Mehmet falls in love with her, and her dream comes true.

Cast

Popularity
In Saudi Arabia, 3-4 million viewers admit to watching the program daily on the Saudi-owned MBC channel. The show's final episode attracted a record 85 million Arab viewers when it aired last Aug. 30.
The success of Gümüş for MBC has sparked a boom in dubbed Turkish dramas across many leading Arab sat-casters. MBC even launched a pay-TV channel in partnership with pay-TV platform Showtime Arabia entirely dedicated to Gümüş that allows viewers to watch episodes of the sudser around the clock.

In Bulgaria, Gümüş is also very popular and every episode is watched by at least 2 million viewers. In the result of its popularity, Songül Öden came to Bulgaria and was a guest in the Bulgarian TV shows "Dancing Stars 2" and "Slavi Show".
She also visited Albania as a guest in the "Kënga Magjike" festival in 2011. It is above average in Pakistan and was airing on Geo Tv but was transferred on Geo Kahani in Pakistan. The series was also popular in Macedonia. Gümüş was one of the first series shown in Macedonia, and now the popularity of the Turkish series in Macedonia is growing.In 2020 Gümüş again star in Urdu Dubbing Online Youtube channel Drama Central

Reception and influence 
Gümüş and Mehmet observe Ramadan, and their marriage is arranged by Mehmet's grandfather but the characters break with tradition in other ways.  Characters are shown drinking wine with dinner, partying, and kissing onscreen which has been deemed inappropriate for younger audiences such as children. Mehmet is depicted to have had sex (and an illegitimate child) before marrying Gümüş, and one of his cousins has an abortion.  Perhaps most significantly, Gümüş and Mehmet's marriage is depicted (in an idealized way) as a modern partnership between equals, in which Mehmet supports his wife's career ambitions as a fashion designer. The AP reports that the show "seems particularly effective in changing attitudes because it offers new content in a familiar setting: Turkey is a Muslim country, inviting stronger viewer identification than Western TV imports."

Maternity wards report a rise in the baby names Noor and Mohannad.

Clothing stores throughout the Middle East report brisk sales of blouses and dresses seen on the television series.

The show encouraged Arabs to visit Turkey. The success of Noor in the Arab world was partly attributed to the fact that it was dubbed into the Syrian dialect—a widely understood living variety of Arabic—and not into the little spoken formal Arabic which had hitherto been used to dub Mexican telenovelas.

The final episode 

In the final episode of the series, the time is moved forwards to 14 years later and the audience sees that everyone has grown up and are all living a happy life. Gümüş is writing in her diaries about what has happened for the past 13 years and shows us how all the characters have grown up and changed including her current pregnancy.

Series overview

References

External links 
 

Turkish drama television series
Television series by D Productions
Turkish television soap operas
2005 Turkish television series debuts
2007 Turkish television series endings
2000s Turkish television series
Kanal D original programming